Frank Spottiswoode (birth unknown — death unknown) was an English professional rugby league footballer who played in the 1900s.

Playing career

International honours
Frank Spottiswoode won a cap for England in the 3-9 defeat by Other Nationalities at Central Park, Wigan on 5 April 1904, in the first ever international rugby league match.

Championship appearances
Frank Spottiswoode played in Oldham's victory in the Championship during the 1904–05 season.

References

External links
(archived by web.archive.org) Statistics at orl-heritagetrust.org.uk

England national rugby league team players
English rugby league players
Oldham R.L.F.C. players
Rugby league players from Cumbria
Place of birth missing
Place of death missing
Rugby league wingers
Year of birth missing
Year of death missing